Maud Wyler (born 14 December 1982) is a French actress. She appeared in more than thirty films since 2009.

Selected filmography

References

External links 

1982 births
Living people
French film actresses
21st-century French actresses
French National Academy of Dramatic Arts alumni